In convex geometry and vector algebra, a convex combination is a linear combination of points (which can be vectors, scalars, or more generally points in an affine space) where all coefficients are non-negative and sum to 1. In other words, the operation is equivalent to a standard weighted average, but whose weights are expressed as a percent of the total weight, instead of as a fraction of the count of the weights as in a standard weighted average.

More formally, given a finite number of points  in a real vector space, a convex combination of these points is a point of the form

where the real numbers  satisfy  and 

As a particular example, every convex combination of two points lies on the line segment between the points.

A set is convex if it contains all convex combinations of its points.
The convex hull of a given set of points is identical to the set of all their convex combinations.

There exist subsets of a vector space that are not closed under linear combinations but are closed under convex combinations. For example, the interval  is convex but generates the real-number line under linear combinations. Another example is the convex set of probability distributions, as linear combinations preserve neither nonnegativity nor affinity (i.e., having total integral one).

Other objects
 A random variable  is said to have an -component finite mixture distribution if its probability density function is a convex combination of  so-called component densities.

Related constructions

A conical combination is a linear combination with nonnegative coefficients.
Weighted means are functionally the same as convex combinations, but they use a different notation. The coefficients (weights) in a weighted mean are not required to sum to 1; instead the weighted linear combination is explicitly divided by the count of the weights.
Affine combinations are like convex combinations, but the coefficients are not required to be non-negative. Hence affine combinations are defined in vector spaces over any field.

See also

Affine hull
Carathéodory's theorem (convex hull)
Simplex
Barycentric coordinate system

References

Convex geometry
Convex hulls
Mathematical analysis

de:Linearkombination#Konvexkombination